King of Thieves may refer to:

 The head thief of a thieves' guild
 King of Thieves (2004 film), a German film directed by Ivan Fíla and starring Lazar Ristovski
 King of Thieves (2018 film), a British film produced by Working Title Films
 King of Thieves (2022 film), a Nigerian thriller film
 "The King of Thieves", 1995 TV series episode of Hercules: The Legendary Journeys
 "The King of Thieves", 1969 TV series episode of It Takes a Thief
 Errol Flynn (album), a 1989 album by The Dogs D'Amour released in the United States as 
 "King of Thieves", 1983 song on the album Punch the Clock by Elvis Costello and the Attractions
 The King of Thieves, 2008 mystery novel by Michael Jecks
 Scooter Braun

Fictional characters
 Wul-Takim, in the 1903 children's fantasy novel The Enchanted Island of Yew by L. Frank Baum
 Autolycus (played by Bruce Campbell), the self-proclaimed King of Thieves in the Hercules: The Legendary Journeys and Xena: Warrior Princess television series
 King of Thieves, sorcerer in the comic and animated series Teenage Mutant Ninja Turtles
 Ryo Bakura (a.k.a. Bakura, King of Thieves), in the anime and manga Yu-Gi-Oh!
 Ganondorf, in The Legend of Zelda video game series
 George Cooper, in the 1983 fantasy novel Alanna: The First Adventure by Tamora Pierce
 The Jackal, in the 2003 young adult fantasy novel The Oracle by Catherine Fisher
 Jonathan Wild, in the 2005–6 The Phantom story "Jonathan Wild: King of Thieves"
 Arsène Lupin in the 2007 video game Sherlock Holmes Versus Arsène Lupin

See also
 
 
 Aladdin and the King of Thieves, a 1996 Disney direct-to-video film
 "Brum and the King of Thieves", a 2001 episode of the children's television series Brum
 Prince of Thieves (disambiguation)